The Anglican Church of St Lawrence in Stanton Prior, Somerset, England, has its origins in the 12th century but is mainly 15th century. The church has been designated by English Heritage as a Grade II* listed building.

The church has a 3-stage tower, supported by diagonal buttresses with polygonal stair turret on the north east corner.

In 1860 a major restoration was undertaken and it was found that the nave and chancel were the same height, which had been obscured since the insertion of windows, raising of the walls and erection of the open timber roof during the Perpendicular Period.

It is within the benefice of Farmborough, Marksbury and Stanton Prior, Corston and Newton St Loe, and in the Archdeaconry of Bath.

References

12th-century church buildings in England
15th-century church buildings in England
Church of England church buildings in Bath and North East Somerset
Grade II* listed churches in Somerset
Grade II* listed buildings in Bath and North East Somerset